The presumption of innocence is a legal principle that every person accused of any crime is considered innocent until proven guilty. Under the presumption of innocence, the legal burden of proof is thus on the prosecution, which must present compelling evidence to the trier of fact (a judge or a jury).  If the prosecution does not prove the charges true, then the person is acquitted of the charges. The prosecution must in most cases prove that the accused is guilty beyond a reasonable doubt. If reasonable doubt remains, the accused must be acquitted.  The opposite system is a presumption of guilt.

In many countries and under many legal systems, including common law and civil law systems (not to be confused with the other kind of civil law, which deals with non-criminal legal issues), the presumption of innocence is a legal right of the accused in a criminal trial.  It is also an international human right under the UN's Universal Declaration of Human Rights, Article 11.

History

Roman law 
The sixth-century Digest of Justinian (22.3.2) provides, as a general rule of evidence: "Proof lies on him who asserts, not on him  who denies".  It is there attributed to the second and third century jurist Julius Paulus Prudentissimus. It was introduced in Roman criminal law by emperor Antoninus Pius.

A civil law system is a modern legal system derived from the ancient Roman legal system (as opposed to the English common law system).  The maxim and its equivalents have been adopted by many countries that use a civil law system, including Brazil, China, France, Italy, Philippines, Poland, Romania and Spain.

Talmudical law 
According to Talmud, "every man is innocent until proved guilty. Hence, the infliction of unusual rigours on the accused must be delayed until his innocence has been successfully challenged. Thus, in the early stages of the trial, arguments in his defence are as elaborate as with any other man on trial. Only when his guilt has become apparent were the solicitous provisions that had been made to protect defendants waived".

Islamic law 
The presumption of innocence is fundamental to Islamic law where the principle that the onus of proof is on the accuser or claimant is strongly held, based on a hadith documented by Imam Nawawi. "Suspicion" is also highly condemned, this also from a hadith documented by Imam Nawawi as well as Imam Bukhari and Imam Muslim.

After the time of Muhammad, the fourth Caliph Ali ibn Abi Talib has also been cited to say, "Avert the prescribed punishment by rejecting doubtful evidence."

Middle Ages in Europe

Western Europe
After the collapse of the Western Roman Empire, the West began to practice feudal law, which was a synthesis of aspects of Roman law as well as some Germanic customs according to the new elite, including presumed guilt. For instance, the accused could prove his innocence by having twelve people swear that he could not have done what he was accused of. In practice, this tended to favor the nobility over the lower classes, whose witnesses risked being seen as less credible. 

Trials by ordeal were common from the 6th century until the early 13th century, and were known to continue into the 17th century in the form of witch-hunts. Whilst common in early Germanic law, compurgation was formally adopted in Rome by Pope Innocent III in 1215 at the Fourth Lateran Council and trials by fire and water specifically were forbidden. This was during the period of development of the jus commune, the canon law of the Catholic Church influenced the common law during the medieval period

In the early 13th century, Louis IX of France banned all trials by ordeal and introduced the presumption of innocence to criminal procedures. It was during the seventh crusade that he had witnessed the presumption of innocence in practice by the ruling Muslims and sought to adopt and implement this law on his return to France . As a reformer, this and other legal and economic reforms led to him being the only canonized king of France.

Eastern Europe
Following the aforementioned Roman law of Justinian, who lived at the dawn of the medieval era, the Byzantine Empire generally continued along his legal code which includes presumption of innocence. This also influenced nearby states within its cultural sphere, such as Eastern Orthodox, Slavic principalities like Serbia.

Meaning

"Presumption of innocence" serves to emphasize that the prosecution has the obligation to prove each element of the offense beyond a reasonable doubt (or some other level of proof depending on the criminal justice system) and that the accused bears no burden of proof. This is often expressed in the phrase "presumed innocent until proven guilty", coined by the British barrister Sir William Garrow (1760–1840) during a 1791 trial at the Old Bailey. Garrow insisted that accusers be robustly tested in court. An objective observer in the position of the juror must reasonably conclude that the defendant almost certainly committed the crime. In 1935, in its judgment of Woolmington v Director of Public Prosecutions, the English Court of Appeal would later describe this concept as being 'the golden thread' running through the web of English criminal law. Garrow's statement was the first formal articulation of this.

The presumption of innocence was originally expressed by the French cardinal and canonical jurist Jean Lemoine in the phrase "item quilbet presumitur innocens nisi probetur nocens (a person is presumed innocent until proven guilty)", based on the legal inference that most people are not criminals. However, this referred not merely to the fact that the burden of proof rests on the prosecution in a criminal case, but the protections which a defendant should be given: prior notice of the accusation being made against them, the right of confrontation, right to counsel, etc. It is literally considered favorable evidence for the accused that automatically attaches at trial. It requires that the trier of fact, be it a juror or judge, begin with the presumption that the state is unable to support its assertion. To ensure this legal protection is maintained, a set of three related rules govern the procedure of criminal trials.  The presumption means:

With respect to the critical facts of the case—whether the crime charged was committed and whether the defendant was the person who committed the crime—the state has the entire burden of proof.
With respect to the critical facts of the case, the defendant does not have any burden of proof whatsoever. The defendant does not have to testify, call witnesses or present any other evidence, and if the defendant elects not to testify or present evidence, this decision cannot be used against them.
The jury or judge is not to draw any negative inferences from the fact the defendant has been charged with a crime and is present in court and represented by an attorney. They must decide the case solely on evidence presented during the trial.

Blackstone's ratio as expressed by the English jurist William Blackstone in his seminal work, Commentaries on the Laws of England, published in the 1760s, said that:

The idea subsequently became a staple of legal thinking in Anglo-Saxon jurisdictions and continues to be a topic of debate.

This duty on the prosecution was famously referred to as the “golden thread” in the criminal law by Lord Sankey LC in Woolmington v DPP:

Fundamental right
This right is considered important enough in modern democracies, constitutional monarchies and republics that many have explicitly included it in their legal codes and constitutions:

 The Universal Declaration of Human Rights, article 11, states: "Everyone charged with a penal offence has the right to be presumed innocent until proven guilty according to law in a public trial at which he has had all the guarantees necessary for his defense."
The International Covenant on Civil and Political Rights, art. 14, paragraph 2 states that "Everyone charged with a criminal offence shall have the right to be presumed innocent until proved guilty according to law." The presumption of innocence is also expressly regulated in Art. 66 of the Rome Statute of the International Criminal Court, according to which "Everyone shall be presumed innocent until proved guilty before the Court in accordance with the applicable law."
 The Convention for the Protection of Human Rights and Fundamental Freedoms of the Council of Europe says (art. 6.2): "Everyone charged with a criminal offence shall be presumed innocent until proved guilty according to law." This convention has been adopted by treaty and is binding on all Council of Europe members. Currently (and in any foreseeable expansion of the EU) every country member of the European Union is also member to the Council of Europe, so this stands for EU members as a matter of course. Nevertheless, this assertion is iterated verbatim in Article 48 of the Charter of Fundamental Rights of the European Union.
 In the UK, the presumption of innocence is provided for by section 6 of the Human Rights Act 1998, which aims to incorporate the rights contained in the aforementioned European Convention on Human Rights.
 Articles 8 (1) and 8 (2) (right to a fair trial), in conjunction with Article 1 (1) (obligation to respect and ensure rights without discrimination), of the American Convention on Human Rights make the Inter-American Court to stress that "the presumption of innocence is a guiding principle in criminal trials and a foundational standard for the assessment of the evidence. Such assessment must be rational, objective, and impartial in order to disprove the presumption of innocence and generate certainty about criminal responsibility. ... The Court reiterated that, in criminal proceedings, the State bears the burden of proof. The accused is not obligated to affirmatively prove his innocence or to provide exculpatory evidence. However, to provide counterevidence or exculpatory evidence is a right that the defence may exercise in order to rebut the charges, which in turn the accusing party bears the burden of disproving".
 In Canada, section 11(d) of the Canadian Charter of Rights and Freedoms states: "Any person charged with an offence has the right to be presumed innocent until proven guilty according to law in a fair and public hearing by an independent and impartial tribunal".
 In the Colombian constitution, Title II, Chapter 1, Article 29 states that "Every person is presumed innocent until proven guilty according to the law".
 In France, article 9 of the Declaration of the Rights of Man and of the Citizen of 1789, which has force as constitutional law, begins: "Any man being presumed innocent until he has been declared guilty ..." The Code of Criminal Procedure states in its preliminary article that "any person suspected or prosecuted is presumed innocent for as long as their guilt has not been established" and the jurors' oath repeats this assertion (article 304; note that only the most serious crimes are tried by jury in France). However, there exists a popular misconception that under French law, the accused is presumed guilty until proven innocent.
 In Iran, Article 37 of the Constitution of the Islamic Republic of Iran states: "Innocence is to be presumed, and no one is to be held guilty of a charge unless his or her guilt has been established by a competent court".
 In Italy, the second paragraph of Article 27 of the Constitution states: "A defendant shall be considered not guilty until a final sentence has been passed."
 In Romania, article 23 of the Constitution states that "any person shall be presumed innocent until found guilty by a final decision of the court".
 The Constitution of Russia, in article 49, states that "Everyone charged with a crime shall be considered not guilty until his or her guilt has been proven in conformity with the federal law and has been established by the valid sentence of a court of law". It also states that "The defendant shall not be obliged to prove his or her innocence" and "Any reasonable doubt shall be interpreted in favor of the defendant".
 In the South African Constitution, section 35(3)(h) of the Bill of Rights states: "Every accused person has a right to a fair trial, which includes the right to be presumed innocent, to remain silent, and not to testify during the proceedings."
 Although the Constitution of the United States does not cite it explicitly, presumption of innocence is widely held to follow from the Fifth, Sixth, and Fourteenth Amendments. The case of Coffin v. United States (1895) established the presumption of innocence of persons accused of crimes. See also In re Winship.
 In New Zealand, the New Zealand Bill of Rights 1990 provides at section 25 (c) "Everyone who is charged with an offence has, in relation to the determination of the charge, the following minimum rights: (c) the right to be presumed innocent until proved guilty according to law".

Modern practices

United Kingdom

In the United Kingdom changes have been made affecting this principle. Defendants' previous convictions may in certain circumstances be revealed to juries. Although the suspect is not compelled to answer questions after formal arrest, failure to give information may now be prejudicial at trial. Statute law also exists which provides for criminal penalties for failing to decrypt data on request from the police. If the suspect is unwilling to do so, it is an offence. Citizens can therefore be convicted and imprisoned without any evidence that the encrypted material was unlawful. Furthermore, in sexual offence cases such as rape, where the sexual act has already been proved beyond reasonable doubt, there are a limited number of circumstances where the defendant has an obligation to adduce evidence that the complainant consented to the sexual act, or that the defendant reasonably believed that the complainant was consenting.  These circumstances include, for example, where the complainant was unconscious, unlawfully detained, or subjected to violence.

Canada
In Canadian law, the presumption of innocence has been reinforced in certain instances. The Criminal Code previously contained numerous provisions according to which defences to certain offences were subject to a reverse onus: that is, if an accused wishes to make that defence, they had to prove the facts of the defence to a balance of probabilities, rather than the Crown having to disprove the defence beyond a reasonable doubt. This meant that an accused in some circumstances might be convicted even if a reasonable doubt existed about their guilt. In several cases, various reverse onus provisions were found to violate the presumption of innocence provision of the Canadian Charter of Rights and Freedoms. They were replaced with procedures in which the accused merely had to demonstrate an "air of reality" to the proposed defence, following which the burden shifted to the Crown to disprove the defence.

Bill C-51, An Act to amend the Criminal Code and the Department of Justice Act and to make consequential amendments to another Act, received Royal Assent in December 2018. Among other things, it eliminated several reverse onus provisions from the Criminal Code, some of which had previously been found unconstitutional, and others pre-emptively in order to avoid further Charter challenges.

See also

 Adversarial system
 Blackstone's formulation
 Due process
 Habeas corpus
 Hitchens's razor
 Null hypothesis
 Presumption of guilt
 Rebuttable presumption
 Right to a fair trial
 Right to silence
 Trial by media
 Presumption of supply in New Zealand

References

Citations

Sources 

 
 Singh, Rahul, Reverse onus Clauses: A Comparative Law Perspective, Student Advocate, Vol. 13, pp. 148–172.
 Bury, J. B. (1893). A History of the Roman Empire from its Foundation to the Death of Marcus Aurelius.

External links

 The Presumption of Innocence in the French and Anglo-American Legal Traditions 
 The History of Presumed Innocence
 What’s Wrong with Military Trials of Terrorist Suspects?
 Kenneth Pennington, Innocent Until Proven Guilty: The Origins of a Legal Maxim, 63 JURIST: STUD. CHURCH L. & MINISTRY 106 (2003).

Criminal procedure
Legal doctrines and principles
Doubt
Human rights